The presidential transition of John F. Kennedy began when he won the 1960 United States presidential election, becoming the president-elect of the United States, and ended when Kennedy was inaugurated at noon EST on January 20, 1961.

Kennedy placed Clark Clifford in charge of the transition effort. Outgoing president Dwight D. Eisenhower and his administration cooperated with President-elect Kennedy and his team on a number of aspects of the transition to facilitate the peaceful transfer of power. At the time, United States presidential transitions were far less elaborate than they have since developed to be in subsequent decades. Kennedy's transition was a volunteer-run operation.

Clark Clifford acted as head of the transition, and Eisenhower named White House Chief of Staff Wilton Persons as his administration's representative to the transition. Particularly during the later part of the transition, Clifford and Persons both spoke on the phone and met in person with each other frequently. The other top officials of Kennedy's transition were individuals that had also been part of his presidential campaign, including Robert F. Kennedy, Larry O'Brien Kenneth O'Donnell, Pierre Salinger, Sargent Shriver, Stephen Edward Smith, and Ted Sorensen. The transition was largely funded by the Democratic National Committee.

While Eisenhower and Kennedy each thought negatively of the other at the time of the transition, the two intended to avoid a rough, tension-filled transition akin to the previous one between President Truman and Eisenhower. Ahead of the election, Kennedy's campaign and the administration of term-limited outgoing president Eisenhower had taken some actions to study past transitions and prepare for the 1960–61 presidential transition. Shortly after the election, Kennedy began receiving extensive daily briefings from the Central Intelligence Agency (CIA), as well as briefings from the Department of State.

Pre-election actions
A presidential transition was scheduled to occur after the 1960 United States presidential election, as incumbent president Dwight D. Eisenhower was term-limited. In anticipation of this, shortly after the 1960 presidential nominating conventions, Eisenhower created an advisory committee to study presidential transitions, headed by Robert Daniel Murphy.

Planning for a prospective presidential transition by John F. Kennedy began ahead of the election. Kennedy placed Clark Clifford and Richard Neustadt in charge of these preparations. The two largely acted independently of one another in researching presidential transitions and advising Kennedy on his potential transition.

Kennedy first began to talk with Clifford about his prospective presidential transition soon after winning the Democratic nomination at the 1960 Democratic National Convention. The Brookings Institution discreet established an advisory group to review past presidential transitions and to help plan for a smooth transition into the next presidency. The group included fourteen former government officials that had served as presidential advisers, as well as Brookings scholars and business executives from leading United States corporations. The group's members overall had strong experience in managerial skills and domestic and foreign policy. Involved in this review of transitions was also Laurin L. Henry, who had been writing a book on the subject of presidential transitions (Presidential Transitions), which would be published that November. The Brookings Institution review was funded with a grant from the Carnegie Corporation of New York. David W. Kendall, incumbent president Dwight D. Eisenhower's White House counsel, was key in establishing this project and bringing both major party candidates into the fold. After Kennedy learned that the Brookings Institution was conducting this review presidential transitions, he sent Clifford to participate. The Eisenhower administration had Secretary to the Cabinet Brad Patterson serve as its liaison attend these discussions, while the team of Kennedy's opponent, Richard Nixon, sent Robert E. Cushman Jr. as their liaison. In addition to participating in these discussions, Clifford created his own report on problems experienced by presidential transitions.

Neustadt had first been asked by Chairman of the Democratic National Committee Henry M. Jackson to write a memo on presidential transitions, which Jackson received on September 15. Days after Jackson received the memo, he held a meeting with Kennedy and Neustadt at Kennedy's house in the Georgetown neighborhood of Washington, D.C. where Kennedy read the memo and asked Neustadt various questions. Kennedy then tasked Neustadt with creating a report assessing post-election problems for presidents-elect, particularly those regarding organizing a White House staff. In the northern hemisphere's Summer of 1960, Kennedy also announced the creation of a special defense and foreign policy committee led by Paul Nitze.

Official transition

Kennedy, arguably, did not become president-elect of the United States until November 9, 1960, the day after the election. While The New York Times (among the first outlets to project Kennedy to be the victor) had projected Kennedy's victory shortly before midnight EST on election night, many other prominent media outlets, such as NBC, waited until the morning of November 9 to project Kennedy as the victor.

After Nixon conceded the election on November 9, President Eisenhower sent President-elect Kennedy two telegrams. One of the telegrams was sent to briefly congratulate the president-elect, and the second one saw Eisenhower both promise to cooperate on an orderly transfer of power and give proposals on how to proceed with one. In Eisenhower's second telegram he offered to meet with Kennedy, "to consider problems of continuity of government and orderly transfer of Executive responsibility on January 20th from my administration to yours". He also named his White House chief of staff, Wilton Persons, as his administration's representative for the transition. He stated that Persons would be prepared to make arrangements by which representatives appointed by Kennedy could meet with heads of executive branch departments. He also suggested that Kennedy's representatives the White House budget office hold meetings to discuss government administration and budget matters, as well as Kennedy's representatives meet with the secretary of state for foreign policy updates.

On November 10, Kennedy and his team held a staff meeting in which they went over the three separate memos created by Clifford, Neustadt, and the Brookings Institution.

Organization of the transition effort
United States presidential transitions were far smaller and more informal at the time Kennedy was elected than they later developed to be. Kennedy based his transition operations out largely of his personal residence in the Georgetown neighborhood of Washington, D.C. He also held transition planning meetings at his home as well as other locations in Washington, including his U.S. Senate office, the Democratic National Committee offices, his former campaign headquarters in the Esso Building, Clark Clifford's law offices, and conference rooms at the Brookings Institution. Serving the function of Kennedy's personal "offices" during the campaign was his Georgetown residence, his family's Palm Beach, Florida residence, and the penthouse of the Carlyle Hotel.

The transition was headed by Clifford, who worked with a handful of close associates of Kennedy. None of the transition workers received financial compensation. The transition relied on volunteer staffers.

The transition's top officials were individuals who had been part of Kennedy's presidential campaign. They also happened to largely be relatively young, but were also experienced in Washington, D.C. politics, many even more so than their counterparts in past transitions. On November 10, during a meeting in Hyannis Port, Massachusetts, with his top advisors, Kennedy assigned them their roles for the transition. Clifford and Neustadt were named the formal transition advisors, tasked with planning the transition. Clifford was additionally named the transition's liaison to the Eisenhower administration. Pierre Salinger was assigned to be the head of the transition's press team (the press secretary). Kenneth O'Donnell was put in charge of administration and appointments. Sargent Shriver (Kennedy's brother-in-law) was put in charge of the selection process for high-level appointees, however, and Larry O'Brien was put in charge of patronage appointments. Ted Sorensen was put in charge of creating the policy agenda and the writing of statements and speeches. Robert F. Kennedy (Kennedy's brother) was a general advisor to the transition. Stephen Edward Smith (Kennedy's brother-in-law) was in charge of the transition's finances. Additionally advising the transition on certain matters were Kennedy's brother Ted Kennedy and father Joseph P. Kennedy.

James E. Webb was also involved in the transition. Paul Samuelson headed an economic task force as part of the transition. Harris Wofford was charged with leading the transition in laying-out policy related to civil rights, as well as selecting civil rights-related personnel. There had been tensions during the campaign between individuals aligned with Sorensen and individuals aligned with O'Donnell. To diffuse any similar tensions if the arose, Fred Dutton was brought into the transition in an initially unclear role to act as a sort of neutral figure.

Kennedy's transition effort had to request funding from the Democratic National Committee (DNC) in order to pay its expenses. The DNC provided most of the funding for the transition.

Actions of transition head Clark Clifford
On November 14, Clifford met with Wilton Persons at the White House for their first face-to-face meeting to discuss the transition. During the meeting, Persons agreed to Clifford's request to have the Kennedy team send an office manager to examine the organizational structure of Eisenhower's White House. It was also at this meeting that the two scheduled the December 6 meeting between the president-elect and the outgoing president. After their meeting, they provided a general summary of the two-hour meeting to deputy White House press secretary Anne Williams Wheaton, who then provided a briefing on it to the press. After this meeting, further actions Clifford and Persons would each undertake in the transition would go on behind closed doors, as they would both recede from the public eye for the rest of the transition.

By December 1, the two had held five in-person meetings. As the transition progressed, Clifford and Person would meet twice or thrice weekly with Persons, with Clifford often being accompanied by Ted Sorenson, and Persons often being accompanied by individuals such as White House counsel Dave Kendall and White House executive clerk William J. Hopkins. They would also have daily telephone conversations. Per instructions issued by Eisenhower several days after the two's November 14 meeting, Persons kept a detailed written record of his activities in the transition.

Intelligence briefings for the president-elect
At the November 14 meeting between Clifford and Persons, it was arranged that Kennedy would receive briefings., Kennedy afterwards received extensive daily briefings by the Central Intelligence Agency (CIA), including some delivered directly from Richard M. Bissell Jr. and Allen Dulles (Director of Central Intelligence). Kennedy also received briefings from the State Department.

The CIA briefed Kennedy on covert plans against Fidel Castro of Cuba, as the CIA was planning what would ultimately become the Bay of Pigs Invasion. At the time of the transition, relations between the United States and Cuba were greatly deteriorating. Soon after Castro entered power in early 1959, the United States was concerned that Castro was anti-American and untrustworthy and that he might make Cuba a communist nation allied with the Eastern Bloc. In early 1960, Castro signed a trade treaty with the Soviet Union. The United States was concerned that Castro's government would bring an expansion of communism into the Western Hemisphere. As Cuba began increasing its nationalization of foreign property, the United States began to decrease its trade with Cuba. In response to Cuba's actions, particularly its Soviet trade deal, in March 1960, the Eisenhower administration approved the training of a group Cuban exiles to lead an overthrow of Castro's government. These exiles would later unsuccessfully undertake the Bay of Pigs Invasion. In 1987, historian Carl M. Brauer would fault the fiasco of the Bay of Pigs Invasion on Kennedy and his team having been too trusting of the bureaucratic experts in the government during the transition.

Kennedy was given forewarning on certain Eisenhower administration actions during the transition. For instance, when Eisenhower decided on December 5 to put a pause on the nuclear arm negotiations that were taking place with the Soviet Union in Geneva, Secretary of State Christian Herter decided to inform Kennedy before informing the United Kingdom and the Soviet Union.

Eisenhower's role in transition

The presidential transition would mark a generational change in the presidency. Kennedy, the youngest person to win a United States presidential election, would be succeeding Eisenhower, who was, at the time, the oldest man to have served as president of the United States. Going into the transition, Kennedy and Eisenhower had both thought ill of one another, in large part due to conceptions of each other that were shaped by this generation gap. However, Eisenhower, who had failed to run a smooth transition when he was president-elect, understood the costs of a poorly managed transition, and, overall, sought to play a role in making Kennedy's transition run smoothly. Moreover, Kennedy also desired to avoid the sort of open antagonism that had been displayed between Eisenhower and Truman during Eisenhower's presidential transition, as he understood that the outgoing Eisenhower, despite Kennedy's own harsh judgements of him, was still a popular figure in the opinion of the American public. Eisenhower sent Kennedy a congratulatory message after the birth of the president-elect's son John F. Kennedy Jr. (born November 25, 1960), helping to break the ice between the two of them.

During the transition, outgoing President Eisenhower held two meetings with Kennedy, one on December 6 and another on January 19. The December 6 meeting was the first time the two men had ever had a one-on-one meeting with one another. Outside of large gatherings Kennedy and Eisenhower had both attended during Eisenhower's presidency, their only previous meeting had been a brief interaction Kennedy had with then-commanding general Eisenhower when accompanying Navy secretary James Forrestal to the warfront in 1945. During their post-election meetings they discussed, among other things, nuclear codes and foreign policy topics such as Berlin (tensions between East Germany and West Germany), Guatemala, the Far East, conflict in Asia, Cuba, Pentagon reform, and the operations of the National Security Council. Eisenhower also shared insight into foreign leaders such as Charles de Gaulle, Harold Macmillan, and Konrad Adenauer. Their first meeting, on December 6, saw the two men meet alone for two hours in the White House's Oval Office, before joining several members of the outgoing Cabinet (Secretary of the Treasury Robert B. Anderson, Secretary of Defense Thomas S. Gates Jr., Secretary of State Christian Herter) for a second meeting in the Roosevelt Room. Clark Clifford and Wilton Persons also attended the group meeting in the Roosevelt Room, and White House Press Secretary James Hagerty and Kennedy advisor Pierre Salinger both joined to help write a joint statement to be released by the president and president-elect after the meeting. Their second meeting had been requested by Kennedy, as he particularly hoped to further discuss the Laotian Civil War.

Eisenhower thought that the Kennedy administration would blame him for its failures and take credit for Eisenhower's successes. He worried that any holdovers from his administration would be used as foils by the new administration. Eisenhower discouraged senior members of his own administration from accepting jobs in Kennedy's. For example, when he discovered that C. Douglas Dillon, under secretary of state in the Eisenhower administration, was under consideration to be Kennedy's secretary of the treasury, Eisenhower urged Dillon not to accept the position, warning him that he would become a scapegoat to the "radicals" in Kennedy's administration. Eisenhower was angered when Dillon disregarded his advice and accepted the position.

Per later recounting by some officials involved, Eisenhower, in the waning days of his presidency, invited Kennedy to play a role in decision-making on significant issues, but Kennedy declined the offer. Kennedy advisor Ted Sorensen would later write that Kennedy, "thought it was inappropriate, unwise, until he had full responsibility and information to participate in, commit himself to, or even comment or be consulted upon these actions being taken by the outgoing administration between election and inauguration – including a mission to western Europe to improve the payments balance and ending of all diplomatic relations with Cuba." Incidentally, during Eisenhower's own presidential transition from President Truman there were reports that Truman had extended a similar offer which Eisenhower had also declined.

Other developments
Kennedy held his first post-election press conference on November 9, where he discussed the transition and announced, for the first time, the names of several individuals that he had selected for his administration.

Early into the transition, Kennedy had a long vacation at a home owned by his father, Joseph P. Kennedy, in Palm Beach, Florida. His wife, Jacqueline, due to give birth in three weeks (to their son John F. Kennedy Jr.), did not join him, as she had been advised by her doctors against traveling to Florida.

On November 11, Kennedy spoke by telephone with former president Herbert Hoover. On November 14, Kennedy traveled from Palm Beach to Key Biscayne, Florida to meet with Richard Nixon, who was both his presidential election opponent and the outgoing vice president. This meeting had been arranged with the assistance of Kennedy's father Joseph P. Kennedy and former president Hoover.

On November 16, Kennedy flew to Texas to meet with Vice President-elect Lyndon B. Johnson at the LBJ Ranch. This was the first time that the two had met with one another since the election.

On December 11, Kennedy avoided an assassination attempt. That day, Richard Paul Pavlick delayed his planned assassination attempt and was apprehended by authorities four days later, before he could carry one out.

On December 9, Kennedy's wife Jacqueline received a tour of the White House from Eisenhower's wife Mamie. This was marked by an unfriendly moment in the transition. Mamie Eisenhower was apparently unhappy with having her husband be succeeded by a Democrat, and herself being succeeded by a woman she held in low regard. Despite Mrs. Kennedy having given birth to her son via caesarean section only two weeks earlier, Mrs. Eisenhower did not inform Kennedy that there was a wheelchair available for her to use on the tour. Seeing Mrs. Eisenhower's displeasure during the tour, Mrs. Kennedy kept her composure while in Mrs. Eisenhower's presence, finally collapsing in private once she returned home. When Mamie Eisenhower was later questioned as to why she would do this, the she simply stated, "Because she never asked."

On December 22, Kennedy formally resigned his seat in the United States Senate. On January 3, immediately after taking an oath for the new Senate term to which he had been elected in the November 1960 Senate election (which coincided with the presidential election), Vice President-elect Johnson resigned from his Senate seat. That day, at the urging of president-elect Kennedy, Mike Mansfield successfully ran to be senate majority leader at the meeting of the Senate Democratic caucus held at the Dirksen Senate Office Building. After Mansfield was elected to the position, Johnson asked Mansfield to allow him to have office S-211 (which Johnson been using as his office while senate majority leader) and several other rooms as his vice presidential office at the Capitol. He also wanted the Senate Democrats to keep Bobby Baker as party secretary. These two requests were granted. Johnson, as a third request, asked that, as president of the United States Senate (a role which the vice president formally holds), he be made permanent presiding officer of the Senate Democratic caucus, making the (false) claim that Alben Barkley had done the same when he was vice president. The Democratic caucus was shocked when Johnson brought this proposal to them, and, after he made it, Senator Albert Gore Sr. rose and voiced a long litany of concerns about it. Mansfield threatened to resign as majority leader if the caucus did not approve it. While they approved it, the 63 Democratic senators voted only 46 to 17 to approve it, which was seen as a humiliating total for Johnson. After this, Johnson abandoned the idea of serving as the Senate's "super leader", thereby being dethroned from his position of dominance in the Senate.

White House executive clerk William J. Hopkins provided the Kennedy transition team with detailed briefing books on the incumbent White House staff, as well as maps illustrating the layout of the West Wing of the White House and the Old Executive Office Building. During the transition, Eisenhower's administration also prepared their documents for transfer to the future Dwight D. Eisenhower Presidential Library. On January 17, Eisenhower delivered his farewell address. This was considered a significant speech of Eisenhower's presidency, being regarded as a closing "bookend" to his tenure as president.

On January 3, with just more than two weeks left in his presidency, the lame duck Eisenhower made a major international relations decision and ended diplomatic relations with Cuba and closed the United States Embassy in Cuba. The initial reason given was that this was in response to a demand from Cuban leader Fidel that the United States reduce its embassy staff after the Cuban government accused the embassy of being an operating base for espionage. The move signaled that the United States was prepared to take significant action in opposition to Castro's government.

On January 19, after his meeting with Eisenhower, Kennedy and his secretary of labor designee Arthur Goldberg met at the home of Kennedy's friend, William Walton. Kennedy and Goldberg then held a meeting with the AFL–CIO Executive Council, as well as other trade union leaders, at the Carlton Hotel. Also, Kennedy held a meeting at the Sheraton-Park Hotel with the governors of 38 states.

Selection of appointees
Kennedy spent the eight weeks following his election choosing his Cabinet and other top officials. Kennedy's top priority after becoming president-elect was to craft his national security team. Kennedy believed that the establishment figures of the United States military were largely too obsessed with nuclear weapons, and too willing to utilize them. Kennedy would, ultimately, craft an administration that see military decisions placed more in the hands of civilian figures than had been the case in Eisenhower's administration. On November 9, in announcing his first choices for his administration, Kennedy also announced that he had asked J. Edgar Hoover to remain as director of the Federal Bureau of Investigation (FBI) and Allen Dulles to remain as director of the Central Intelligence Agency (CIA) and that both had accepted his requests to remain.

Some individuals declined positions in Kennedy's administration. Kennedy offered Robert A. Lovett a position in his Cabinet, but Lovett declined. Additionally, Kennedy had originally offered the position of postmaster general to congressman William L. Dawson, who declined. Had he accepted and been confirmed to the position, Dawson would have made history as the first black Cabinet secretary in United States history.

Ahead of the election, many correspondence were sent to Kennedy and the Democratic National Committee requesting appointments to government positions. Larry O'Brien was tasked with handling the management of such correspondence. In addition, President-Johnson and his staff sent requests of their own for individuals they wanted to see appointed. Requests coming from Johnson and his office were forwarded to Dick Donahue.

On December 17, Kennedy announced the last of his ten Cabinet designees, J. Edward Day for postmaster general. John D. Morris of The New York Times News Service noted of Kennedy's Cabinet, 

As indicated by Morris, the age of many members of the designated Cabinet was young. The youngest designee was Robert F. Kennedy, at the age of 35. Robert F. Kennedy was to be the second-youngest United States attorney general, after only Richard Rush, who had been 33 when he assumed the office. Two of Kennedy's designees for his Cabinet would be the youngest holders of their designated Cabinet positions: Secretary of Agriculture-designate Orville Freeman (age 42) and Secretary of Defense-designate Robert McNamara (age 44). Morris noted that Eisenhower's initial Cabinet had averaged a decade older in age than Kennedy's designated Cabinet.

Kennedy, a Democrat, designated some Republicans for roles in his administration, including McGeorge Bundy, Douglas Dillon, and Robert McNamara. Dillon, a business-oriented Republican that had served as Eisenhower's undersecretary of state, was to be Kennedy's secretary of the treasury. Kennedy balanced this appointment of a conservative figure by choosing liberal Democrats for two other important economic advisory posts, choosing David E. Bell for the director of the Bureau of the Budget and Walter Heller as chairman of the Council of Economic Advisers. Robert McNamara, who was selected for secretary of defense, was well known as one of Ford Motor Company's "Whiz Kids".

Kennedy rejected liberal pressure to select Adlai Stevenson II as Secretary of State, instead choosing Dean Rusk, a restrained former Truman-administration official. Stevenson accepted the non-policy position of United States ambassador to the United Nations. Despite concerns about nepotism, Kennedy's father successfully demanded that Robert F. Kennedy be chosen for attorney general.

In his White House staff, Kennedy did not choose a formal White House chief of staff, instead, preferring the idea of, in effect, acting as his own chief of staff.

Defense and foreign policy
Robert McNamara, secretary of defense (announced December 13, 1960)
Dean Rusk, secretary of state (announced December 12, 1960)
Adlai Stevenson II, United States ambassador to the United Nations (announced December 12, 1960)
Eugene M. Zuckert, secretary of the Air Force (announced December 28, 1960)
Elvis Jacob Stahr Jr. secretary of the Army
John Connally, secretary of the Navy (announced December 28, 1960)
Allen Dulles, director of the Central Intelligence Agency (announced November 9, 1960) incumbent officeholder
J. Edgar Hoover, director of the Federal Bureau of Investigation (announced November 9, 1960) incumbent officeholder
McGeorge Bundy, national security advisor (announced December 31, 1960)
Roswell Gilpatric, deputy secretary of defense
Chester B. Bowles, under secretary of state
George Ball, under secretary of state for economic affairs
Joseph V. Charyk, under secretary of the Air Force incumbent officeholder
G. Mennen Williams, assistant secretary of state for African affairs
Roger W. Jones, deputy under secretary of state for administration
Angier Biddle Duke, chief of protocol
Lyle S. Garlock, assistant secretary of the Air Force for financial management incumbent officeholder
James H. Wakelin Jr., assistant secretary of the Navy for research and development incumbent officeholder
Walt Whitman Rostow, deputy national security advisor
Charles E. Bohlen, special advisor on Soviet affairs
W. Averell Harriman, special ambassador at large
John Kenneth Galbraith, United States ambassador to India
David K. E. Bruce, United States ambassador to the United Kingdom
Herschel C. Loveless, member of the Federal Renegotiation Board
John J. McCloy, chief of the U.S. Disarmament Administration
George McGovern, director of Food for Peace

Domestic policy
Robert F. Kennedy, attorney general (announced December 16, 1960)
J. Edward Day, postmaster general (announced December 16, 1960)
Orville Freeman, secretary of agriculture (announced December 15, 1960)
Luther H. Hodges, secretary of commerce (announced December 8, 1960)
Abraham Ribicoff, secretary of health, education, and welfare (announced December 1, 1960)
Stewart Udall, secretary of the interior (announced December 7, 1960)
Arthur Goldberg, secretary of labor (announced December 15, 1960)
Luther Terry, surgeon general (announced January 16, 1961)
Byron White, deputy attorney general (announced December 16, 1960)
W. Willard Wirtz, undersecretary of labor (announced January 8, 1961)
H. H. Brawley, deputy postmaster general
James K. Carr, under secretary of the interior (announced January 12, 1961)
Edward Gudeman, under secretary of commerce
Archibald Cox, solicitor general of the United States (announced December 28, 1960)
Robert C. Weaver, administrator of the Housing and Home Finance Agency (announced December 31, 1960)
Newton N. Minow, chairman of the chairman of the Federal Communications Commission
Rex Marion Whitton, administrator of the Federal Highway Administration
Harry J. Anslinger, commissioner of the Federal Bureau of Narcotics (announced December 16, 1960) incumbent officeholder
Floyd Dominy, commissioner of the United States Bureau of Reclamation (announced January 12, 1961) incumbent officeholder
John S. Gleason Jr., administrator of Veterans Affairs
Robert J. Burkhardt, assistant postmaster general for facilities
Ralph W. Nicholson, assistant postmaster general for finance
Frederick C. Belen, assistant postmaster general for postal operations
James M. Quigley, assistant secretary of health, education and welfare for federal and state matters (announced January 16, 1961)
Wilbur J. Cohen, assistant secretary of health, education, and welfare for legislative matters (announced January 16, 1961)
Boisfeuillet Jones, assistant secretary of health, education and welfare for health and medical affairs (announced December 31, 1960)
Kenneth Holum, assistant secretary of the interior for water and power (announced January 12, 1961)
John A. Carver Jr., assistant secretary of the interior for public lands management (announced January 12, 1961)
Jerry R. Holleman, assistant secretary of labor
James J. Reynolds, assistant secretary of labor (announced January 8, 1961)
George C. Lodge, assistant secretary of labor for international affairs incumbent officeholder
George Leon-Paul Weaver, special assistant to the secretary of labor (announced January 8, 1961)
Frank Barry, Department of the Interior solicitor general (announced January 12, 1961)
Charles Donahue, Department of Labor solicitor (announced January 8, 1961)
Alan Willcox, general counsel of the Department of Health, Education and Welfare
Glenn T. Seaborg, chairman of the Atomic Energy Commission (announced January 16, 1961)
Michael Monroney, United States Postal Service executive assistant for White House and congressional liaison

Economic policy
C. Douglas Dillon, secretary of the treasury (announced December 16, 1960)
David E. Bell, director of the Bureau of the Budget
Elizabeth Rudel Smith, treasurer of the United States (announced December 18, 1960)
Harry J. Anslinger, commissioner of the Federal Bureau of Narcotics incumbent officeholder
John M. Leddy, assistant secretary of the treasury for international affairs (announced January 16, 1961)
David E. Bell, director of the Bureau of the Budget
Walter Heller, chair of the Council of Economic Advisers
John E. Horne, administrator of the Small Business Administration
Henry H. Fowler, under secretary of the treasury
Robert Roosa, under secretary of the treasury for monetary affairs
Elmer B. Staats, deputy director of the Bureau of the Budget incumbent officeholder
Esther Peterson, director of the United States Women's Bureau and assistant to the Secretary of Labor (announced January 8, 1961)
Kermit Gordon, member of the Council of Economic Advisers
James Tobin, member of the Council of Economic Advisers
George Docking, director of the Export-Import Bank

White House staff
Pierre Salinger, White House press secretary (announced November 9, 1960)
Andrew Hatcher, associate White House press secretary (announced November 9, 1960)
Ted Sorensen, White House counsel (announced November 9, 1960)
Kenneth O'Donnell, secretary to the president (announced November 9, 1960)
Fred Dutton, White House Cabinet secretary
Ralph A. Dungan, White House staff secretary
Larry O'Brien, assistant to the president for Congressional relations
David Powers, special assistant to the president
James M. Landis, special assistant to the president
Timothy G. Reardon, administrative assistant to the president
Richard Neustadt, consultant on government organization

Other
John Moore, administrator of the General Services Administration
Bernard L. Boutin, deputy administrator of the General Services Administration
John Macy, chairman of the Civil Service Commission

Further reading
Memorandum on the transition by Clark Clifford (November 9, 1960)  –John F. Kennedy Presidential Library and Museum
PAPERS OF JOHN F. KENNEDY. PRE-PRESIDENTIAL PAPERS. TRANSITION FILES –John F. Kennedy Presidential Library and Museum
EISENHOWER-KENNEDY MATERIALS –Dwight D. Eisenhower Presidential Library
Historical Documents Foreign Relations of the United States, 1961–1963, Volume XXIV, Laos Crisis January–March 1961: Transition from the Eisenhower to the Kennedy Administration –United States Department of State

References

Works cited

November 1960 events in the United States
December 1960 events in the United States
January 1961 events in the United States
Presidency of John F. Kennedy
Kennedy, John F.
Lyndon B. Johnson
Presidential transition, Kennedy
Presidential transition, Kennedy